John Douse Langley (17 May 1836 – 8 November 1930) was the second Bishop of Bendigo from 1907 to 1920.

Born in Ballyduff, County Waterford, he was educated at Trinity College, Dublin, and Moore College in New South Wales.

He came to Australia with his family in 1853 and after an earlier career with the Bank of Australasia was ordained in 1873. He held incumbencies in Berrima and Sydney before becoming Archdeacon of Cumberland in 1895 and a canon of St Andrew's Cathedral, Sydney, in 1902.

Langley succeeded his younger brother, Henry Archdall Langley (1844–1906), who was the first Bishop of Bendigo.
He died on 8 November 1930.

References

1836 births
People from County Waterford
Alumni of Trinity College Dublin
20th-century Anglican bishops in Australia
Anglican bishops of Bendigo
1930 deaths
Irish Anglicans